

Route description
Ridge Avenue, also called Ridge Boulevard from Devon Avenue and Howard Street is a street in Chicago and Evanston. It begins at Broadway and Bryn Mawr Avenue in Chicago. From here, it carries U.S. Route 14 to Peterson Avenue. U.S. Route 14 continues south onto Broadway and west onto Peterson Avenue. Between the two intersections, the street also intersects with Clark Street.

The next streets that intersect with Ridge Avenue (called Ridge Boulevard between the first and last streets in the upcoming list) are Devon Avenue, Touhy Avenue, and Howard Street. At Howard Street, Ridge Avenue leaves Chicago and enters Evanston. En route to its north end at Sheridan Road, it also intersects with Dempster Street.

The road is so named because it follows the ancient shoreline of Lake Michigan (formerly Lake Checaugou).

Major intersections

References

Streets in Chicago
U.S. Route 14